ThinkLight was a keyboard light present on many older ThinkPad families of notebook computers.

The series was originally designed by IBM, and then developed and produced by Lenovo since 2005. The ThinkLight has been replaced by a backlight keyboard on later generations of ThinkPads, and Lenovo has discontinued the ThinkLight in 2013.

Description
A white or amber LED (depending on model) is located on the top edge of the display, illuminating the keyboard to allow use in low-light conditions. It is activated with the key combination Fn-PgUp (the bottom left and top right keys of the keyboard). Later ThinkPads use the combination Fn-Space instead. Lenovo later started to include backlit keyboards, and some models included both the ThinkLight and a backlit keyboard. For those models, the Fn-Space shortcut is also used in conjunction to control a backlit keyboard (if the laptop has it). The on-screen display of ThinkPad computers will display a light on and a light off indicator. The ThinkLight can be activated when the monitor is on or off but not while the computer is off.

Some ThinkPads, like the Z and R series (though not all - some R61 and R32 models still have the white light) feature an amber LED due to the lower cost, while other models, like the T series, use a white LED (which is generally preferred).

The G series and SL series omit the ThinkLight.

A few ThinkPads (17" W700 and W701) have featured the ThinkLight with dual white LEDs.

Alternatives 

The HP EliteBook series notebooks contain a similar keyboard light called HP Night Light. Unlike the ThinkLight, it is activated by a physical button next to the Night Light, rather than a keyboard shortcut. Third-parties offered external LED-based illumination solutions for the HP 200LX series of DOS palmtop computers in the late 1990s.

The Dell Latitude ATG series laptops have also contained a pair of red LEDs which are controlled in a very similar way to the IBM ThinkLight and also serve to illuminate the keyboard.

Some computer manufacturers have opted for backlit keyboards instead of illuminating the keyboard from above; but some ThinkPads included both the ThinkLight and a backlit keyboard (for example, T530, T430 and X230 models).

See also 
 Selective yellow

References

External links 

IBM UK ThinkPad Designs
ThinkLight on ThinkWiki — section listing ThinkPad models that feature the ThinkLight

Thinklight